Acanthodica grandis is a moth of the family Noctuidae. It is found in Mexico.

Catocalina
Moths of Central America
Moths described in 1894